Little Rock is the capital and most populous city of the U.S. state of Arkansas. The city's population was 204,405 in 2022, according to the United States Census Bureau. As the county seat of Pulaski County, the city was incorporated on November 7, 1831, on the south bank of the Arkansas River close to the state's geographic center. The city derived its name from a rock formation along the river, named the "Little Rock" (French: Le Petit Rocher) by the French explorer Jean-Baptiste Bénard de la Harpe in 1722. The capital of the Arkansas Territory was moved to Little Rock from Arkansas Post in 1821.  The six-county Little Rock–North Little Rock–Conway, AR Metropolitan Statistical Area (MSA) is ranked 81st in terms of population in the United States with 748,031 residents according to the 2020 estimate by the United States Census Bureau.

Little Rock is a cultural, economic, government, and transportation center within Arkansas and the South. Several cultural institutions are in Little Rock, such as the Arkansas Museum of Fine Arts, the Arkansas Repertory Theatre, the Arkansas Symphony Orchestra, and the Mosaic Templars Cultural Center, in addition to hiking, boating, and other outdoor recreational opportunities. Little Rock's history is available through history museums, historic districts or neighborhoods of Little Rock like the Quapaw Quarter, and historic sites such as Little Rock Central High School. The city is the headquarters of Dillard's, Windstream Communications, Stephens Inc., University of Arkansas for Medical Sciences, Heifer International, Winrock International, the Clinton Foundation, and the Rose Law Firm.

Etymology
Little Rock derives its name from a small rock formation on the south bank of the Arkansas River called the "Little Rock" (French: La Petite Roche). The Little Rock was used by early river traffic as a landmark and became a well-known river crossing. The Little Rock is across the river from The Big Rock, a large bluff at the edge of the river, which was once used as a rock quarry.

History

Archeological artifacts provide evidence of Native Americans inhabiting Central Arkansas for thousands of years before Europeans arrived. The early inhabitants may have been the Folsom people, Bluff Dwellers, and Mississippian culture peoples who built earthwork mounds recorded in 1541 by Spanish explorer Hernando de Soto. Historical tribes of the area are the Caddo, Quapaw, Osage, Choctaw, and Cherokee.

Little Rock was named for a stone outcropping on the bank of the Arkansas River used by early travelers as a landmark, which marked the transition from the flat Mississippi Delta region to the Ouachita Mountain foothills. It was named in 1722 by French explorer and trader Jean-Baptiste Bénard de la Harpe. Travelers referred to the area as the "Little Rock". Though there was an effort to officially name the city "Arkopolis" upon its founding in the 1820s, and that name did appear on a few maps made by the US Geological Survey, the name Little Rock is eventually what stuck.

Geography
Little Rock is located at  (34.736009, −92.331122).

Little Rock is on the south bank of the Arkansas River in Central Arkansas. Fourche Creek and Rock Creek run through the city, and flow into the river. The western part of the city is in the foothills of the Ouachita Mountains. Northwest of the city limits are Pinnacle Mountain and Lake Maumelle, which provides Little Rock's drinking water.

The city of North Little Rock is just across the river from Little Rock, but it is a separate city. North Little Rock was once the 8th ward of Little Rock. An Arkansas Supreme Court decision on February 6, 1904, allowed the ward to merge with the neighboring town of North Little Rock. The merged town quickly renamed itself Argenta (the local name for the former 8th Ward), but returned to its original name in October 1917.

Neighborhoods

 Applegate
 Birchwood
 Breckenridge
 Briarwood
 Broadmoor
 Bryce's Creek
 Capitol-Main Historic District
 Capitol View/Stifft's Station
 Central High School Historic District
 Chenal Valley
 Cloverdale
 Colony West
 Downtown
 Echo Valley
 East End
 Fair Park
 Geyer Springs
 Governor's Mansion
 Granite Mountain
 Gum Springs
 Hanger Hill
 Hall High
 The Heights
 Highland Park
 Hillcrest
 John Barrow
 Leawood
 Mabelvale
 MacArthur Park
 Marshall Square
 Otter Creek
 Pankey
 Paul Laurence Dunbar School
 Pinnacle Valley
 Pleasant Valley
 Pulaski Heights
 Quapaw Quarter
 Riverdale
 Robinwood
 Rosedale
 Scott Street
 St. Charles
 South End
 South Main Street (apartments)
 South Main Street (residential)
 South Little Rock
 Southwest Little Rock
 Stagecoach
 Sturbridge
 University Park
 Walnut Valley
 Walton Heights
 Wakefield
 West End
 Woodlands Edge

Metropolitan area

The 2020 U.S. Census population estimate for the Little Rock-North Little Rock-Conway, AR Metropolitan Statistical Area was 748,031. The MSA covers the following counties: Pulaski, Faulkner, Grant, Lonoke, Perry, and Saline. The largest cities are Little Rock, North Little Rock, Conway, Jacksonville, Benton, Sherwood, Cabot, Maumelle, and Bryant.

Climate

Little Rock lies in the humid subtropical climate zone (Cfa), with hot, humid summers and cool winters with usually little snow.

Demographics

2020 census

As of the 2020 United States Census, there were 202,591 people, 80,063 households, and 45,577 families residing in the city.

2005-2007 ACS
As of the 2005–2007 American Community Survey conducted by the U.S. Census Bureau, White Americans made up 52.7% of Little Rock's population; of which 49.4% were non-Hispanic Whites, down from 74.1% in 1970. Blacks or African Americans made up 42.1% of Little Rock's population, with 42.0% being non-Hispanic blacks. Native Americans made up 0.4% of Little Rock's population while Asian Americans made up 2.1% of the city's population. Pacific Islander Americans made up less than 0.1% of the city's population. Individuals from some other race made up 1.2% of the city's population; of which 0.2% were non-Hispanic. Individuals from two or more races made up 1.4% of the city's population; of which 1.1% were non-Hispanic. In addition, Hispanics and Latinos made up 4.7% of Little Rock's population.

2010 census
As of the 2010 census, there were 193,524 people, 82,018 households, and 47,799 families residing in the city. The racial makeup of the city was 48.9% White, 42.3% Black, 0.4% Native American, 2.7% Asian, 0.08% Pacific Islander, 3.9% from other races, and 1.7% from two or more races. 6.8% of the population is Hispanic or Latino.

There were 82,018 households, of which 30.5% had children under the age of 18 living with them, 36.6% were married couples living together, 17.5% had a female householder with no husband present, and 41.7% were non-families. 34.8% of all households were made up of individuals, and 8.8% had someone living alone who was 65 years of age or older. The average household size was 2.30 and the average family size was 3.00.

In the city, the population was spread out, with 24.7% under the age of 18, 10.0% from 18 to 24, 31.7% from 25 to 44, 22.0% from 45 to 64, and 11.6% who were 65 years of age or older. The median age was 34 years. For every 100 females, there were 89.2 males. For every 100 females age 18 and over, there were 85 males.

The median income for a household in the city was $37,572, and the median income for a family was $47,446. Males had a median income of $35,689 versus $26,802 for females. The per capita income for the city was $23,209. 14.3% of the population is below the poverty line. Out of the total population, 20.9% of those under the age of 18 and 9.0% of those 65 and older were living below the poverty line.

Crime
In the late 1980s, Little Rock experienced a 51% increase in murder arrests of children under 17, and a 40% increase among 18- to 24-year-olds. From 1988 to 1992, murder arrests of youths under 18 increased by 256%. By the end of 1992, Little Rock reached a record of 61 homicides, but in 1993 surpassed it with 76. It was one of the highest per-capita homicide rates in the country, placing Little Rock fifth in Money Magazine's 1994 list of most dangerous cities. In July 2017, a shootout occurred at the Power Ultra Lounge nightclub in downtown Little Rock; although there were no deaths, 28 people were injured and one hospitalized. In 2021, Little Rock saw a decrease in most violent crime, but a 24% increase in homicides from 2020. The 65 homicides were the third-most on record in the city. Little Rock set a new record of 81 homicides in 2022.

Economy

Dillard's Department Stores, Windstream Communications and Acxiom, Simmons Bank, Bank of the Ozarks, Rose Law Firm, Central Flying Service, and large brokerage Stephens Inc. are headquartered in Little Rock. Large companies headquartered in other cities but with a large presence in Little Rock are Dassault Falcon Jet (near Little Rock National Airport in the eastern part of the city), Fidelity National Information Services (in northwestern Little Rock), and Welspun Corp (in Southeast Little Rock). Little Rock and its surroundings are home to headquarters for large nonprofit organizations, such as Winrock International, Heifer International, the Association of Community Organizations for Reform Now, Clinton Foundation, Lions World Services for the Blind, Clinton Presidential Center, Winthrop Rockefeller Foundation, FamilyLife, Audubon Arkansas, and The Nature Conservancy. Little Rock is also home to the American Taekwondo Association and Arkansas Hospital Association. Arkansas Blue Cross Blue Shield, Baptist Health Medical Center, Entergy, Dassault Falcon Jet, Siemens, AT&T Mobility, Kroger, Euronet Worldwide, L'Oréal, Timex, and UAMS are employers throughout Little Rock. One of the state's largest public employers, with over 10,552 employees, the University of Arkansas for Medical Sciences (UAMS) and its healthcare partners—Arkansas Children's Hospital and the Central Arkansas Veterans Healthcare System—have a total annual economic impact in Arkansas of about $5 billion. UAMS receives less than 11% of its funding from the state; it is funded by payments for clinical services (64%), grants and contracts (18%), philanthropy and other (5%), and tuition and fees (2%). The Little Rock port is an intermodal river port with a large industrial business complex. It is designated as Foreign Trade Zone 14. International corporations such as Danish manufacturer LM Glasfiber have established new facilities adjacent to the port.

Along with Louisville and Memphis, Little Rock has a branch of the Federal Reserve Bank of St Louis.

Arts and culture
Cultural sites in Little Rock include:

 Quapaw Quarter – start of the 20th century Little Rock consists of three National Register historic districts with at least a hundred buildings on the National Register of Historic Places.

Museums

 The Arkansas Arts Center, the state's largest cultural institution, is a museum of art and an active center for the visual and performing arts.
 The Museum of Discovery features hands-on exhibits in the fields of science, history and technology.
 The William J. Clinton Presidential Center includes the Clinton presidential library and the offices of the Clinton Foundation and the Clinton School of Public Service. The Library facility, designed by architect James Polshek, cantilevers over the Arkansas River, echoing Clinton's campaign promise of "building a bridge to the 21st century". The archives and library have 2 million photographs, 80 million pages of documents, 21 million e-mail messages, and nearly 80,000 artifacts from the Clinton presidency. The museum within the library showcases artifacts from Clinton's term and has a full-scale replica of the Clinton-era Oval Office. Opened on November 18, 2004, the Clinton Presidential Center cost $165 million to construct and covers 150,000 square feet (14,000 m2) within a 28-acre (113,000 m2) park.
 The Historic Arkansas Museum is a regional history museum focusing primarily on the frontier time period.
 The MacArthur Museum of Arkansas Military History opened in 2001, the last remaining structure of the original Little Rock Arsenal and one of the oldest buildings in central Arkansas, it was the birthplace of General Douglas MacArthur who went on to be the supreme commander of US forces in the South Pacific during World War II.
 The Old State House Museum is a former state capitol building now home to a history museum focusing on Arkansas's recent history.
 The Mosaic Templars Cultural Center is a nationally accredited, state-funded museum and cultural center focusing on African American history and culture in Arkansas.
 The ESSE Purse Museum illustrates the stories of American women's lives during the 1900s through their handbags and the day-to-day items carried in them

Music and theater
Founded in 1976, the Arkansas Repertory Theatre is the state's largest nonprofit professional theatre company. A member of the League of Resident Theatres (LORT D), The Rep has produced more than 300 productions, including 40 world premieres, in its building in downtown Little Rock. Producing Artistic Director John Miller-Stephany leads a resident staff of designers, technicians and administrators in eight to ten productions for an annual audience in excess of 70,000 for MainStage productions, educational programming and touring. The Rep produces works from contemporary comedies and dramas to world premiers and the classics of dramatic literature.

The Community Theatre of Little Rock, founded in 1956, is the area's oldest performance art company.

The Arkansas Symphony Orchestra performs over 30 concerts a year and many events. 

The Robinson Center Music Hall is the main performance center of the Arkansas Symphony Orchestra.

The Wildwood Park for the Arts is the largest park dedicated to the performing arts in the South; it features seasonal festivals and cultural events.

Restaurants 
Lassis Inn was a meeting place for civil rights leaders in the 1950s and 60s, including Daisy Bates, while they were planning efforts such as the desegregation of Little Rock Central High School. In 2017 it was among the three inaugural inductees into the Arkansas Food Hall of Fame, along with Rhoda's Famous Hot Tamales and Jones Bar-B-Q Diner. In 2020, it was named an America's Classic by the James Beard Foundation.

Parks and recreation
Outside magazine named Little Rock one of its 2019 Best Places to Live. Little Rock has 48 parks, as well as other recreational sites, including:

Arkansas Arboretum – at Pinnacle Mountain; it has a trail with flora and tree plantings.

Arkansas River Trail

Little Rock Zoo – consists of at least 725 animals and over 200 species

Pinnacle Mountain State Park

River Market District – downtown entertainment district consisting of historic buildings along President Clinton Avenue

Willow Springs Water Park – one of the first water theme parks in the U.S., built in 1928.

Government

 
The city has operated under the city manager form of government since November 1957. In 1993, voters approved changes from seven at-large city directors (who rated the position of mayor among themselves) to a popularly elected mayor, seven ward directors and three at-large directors. The position of mayor remained a part-time position until August 2007. At that point, voters approved making the mayor's position a full-time position with veto power, while a vice mayor is selected by and among members of the city board. The current mayor, elected in November 2018, is Frank Scott Jr., a former assistant bank executive, pastor and state highway commissioner. The city manager is Bruce T. Moore, the longest-serving city manager in Little Rock history. The city employs over 2,500 people in 14 different departments, including the police department, the fire department, parks and recreation, and the zoo.

Most Pulaski County government offices are in Little Rock, including the Quorum, Circuit, District, and Juvenile Courts; and the Assessor, County Judge, County Attorney, and Public Defender's offices.

Both the United States District Court for the Eastern District of Arkansas and the United States Court of Appeals for the Eighth Circuit have judicial facilities in Little Rock. The city is served by the Little Rock Police Department.

Education

Colleges and universities
Little Rock is home to two universities that are part of the University of Arkansas System: the campuses of the University of Arkansas at Little Rock and the University of Arkansas for Medical Sciences are in the city. UAMS is Arkansas's largest basic and applied research institution, with programs in multiple myeloma, aging, and other areas.
A pair of smaller, historically black colleges, Arkansas Baptist College and Philander Smith College, affiliated with the United Methodist Church, are also in Little Rock.
Located in downtown is the Clinton School of Public Service, a branch of the University of Arkansas System, which offers master's degrees in public service.
Pulaski Technical College has two locations in Little Rock. The Pulaski Technical College Little Rock-South site houses programs in automotive technology, collision repair technology, commercial driver training, diesel technology, small engine repair technology and motorcycle/all-terrain vehicle repair technology. The Pulaski Technical College Culinary Arts and Hospitality Management Institute and The Finish Line Cafe are also in Little Rock-South.
There is a Missionary Baptist Seminary in Little Rock associated with the American Baptist Association. The school began as Missionary Baptist College in Sheridan in Grant County.

Secondary schools

Public schools

Little Rock is home to both the Arkansas School for the Blind (ASB) and the Arkansas School for the Deaf (ASD), which are state-run schools operated by the Board of Trustees of the ASB–ASD. In addition, eStem Public Charter High School and LISA Academy provide tuition-free public education as charter schools.

The Little Rock School District (LRSD) operates the city's comprehensive public school system. , the district has 64 schools with more schools being built. As of the 2009–2010 school year, the district's enrollment is 25,685. It has 5 high schools, 8 middle schools, 31 elementary schools, 1 early childhood (pre-kindergarten) center, 2 alternative schools, 1 adult education center, 1 accelerated learning center, 1 career-technical center, and about 3,800 employees.

LRSD public high schools include:

 Hall High School
 J. A. Fair Science and Technology Systems Magnet High School
 Little Rock Central High School
 McClellan Magnet High School
 Parkview Arts and Science Magnet High School
 Little Rock Southwest Magnet High School

The Pulaski County Special School District (PCSSD) serves parts of Little Rock. PCSSD high schools are in the city such as:

 Mills University Studies High School
 Joe T. Robinson High School

Private schools
Various private schools are in Little Rock, such as:
 Arkansas Baptist School System
 Central Arkansas Christian Schools
 Christ Little Rock School
 Episcopal Collegiate School
 Little Rock Catholic High School
 Little Rock Christian Academy
 Mount Saint Mary Academy
 Pulaski Academy
Little Rock's Catholic high school for African-Americans, St. Bartholomew High School, closed in 1964. The Catholic grade school St. Bartholomew School, also established for African-Americans, closed in 1974. The Our Lady of Good Counsel School closed in 2006.

Public libraries
The Central Arkansas Library System comprises the main building downtown and numerous branches throughout the city, Jacksonville, Maumelle, Perryville, Sherwood and Wrightsville. The Pulaski County Law Library is at the William H. Bowen School of Law.

Notable places

 Arkansas State Capitol – a neo-classical structure with many restored interior spaces, constructed from 1899 to 1915.
 Big Dam Bridge – The longest pedestrian/bicycle bridge in North America never been used by cars or trucks.
 Roman Catholic Cathedral of St. Andrew (1878-1881)

Sports

Little Rock is home to the Arkansas Travelers. They are the AA professional Minor League Baseball affiliate of the Seattle Mariners in the Texas League. The Travelers played their last game in Little Rock at Ray Winder Field on September 3, 2006, and moved into Dickey-Stephens Park in nearby North Little Rock in April 2007.

The Little Rock Rangers soccer club of the National Premier Soccer League played their inaugural seasons in 2016 & 2017 for the men's and women's teams respectively. Home games are played at War Memorial Stadium.

Little Rock was also home to the Arkansas Twisters (later Arkansas Diamonds) of Arena Football 2 and Indoor Football League and the Arkansas RimRockers of the American Basketball Association and NBA Development League. Both of these teams played at Verizon Arena in North Little Rock.

The city is also home to the Little Rock Trojans, the athletic program of the University of Arkansas at Little Rock. The majority of the school's athletic teams are housed in the Jack Stephens Center, which opened in 2005. As of 2022, the Trojans play in the Ohio Valley Conference.

Little Rock's War Memorial Stadium hosts at least one University of Arkansas Razorback football game each year. The stadium is known for being in the middle of a golf course. Each fall, the city closes the golf course on Razorback football weekends to allow the estimated 80,000 people who attend take part in tailgating activities. War Memorial also hosts the Arkansas High School football state championships, and starting in the fall of 2006 hosts one game apiece for the University of Central Arkansas and the University of Arkansas at Pine Bluff. Arkansas State University also plays at the stadium from time to time.

Little Rock was a host of the First and Second Rounds of the 2008 NCAA men's basketball tournament. It has also been a host of the SEC women's basketball tournament.

The now defunct Arkansas RiverBlades and Arkansas GlacierCats, both minor-league hockey teams, were in the Little Rock area. The GlacierCats of the now defunct Western Professional Hockey League (WPHL) played in Little Rock at Barton Coliseum while the RiverBlades of the ECHL played at the Verizon Arena.

Little Rock is home to the Grande Maumelle Sailing Club. Established in 1959, the club hosts multiple regattas during the year on both Lake Maumelle and the Arkansas River.

Little Rock is also home to the Little Rock Marathon, held on the first Saturday of March every year since 2003. The marathon features the world's largest medal given to marathon participants.

Media

Print
The Arkansas Democrat Gazette is the largest newspaper in the city, as well as the state. As of March 31, 2006, Sunday circulation is 275,991 copies, while daily (Monday-Saturday) circulation is 180,662, according to the Audit Bureau of Circulations. The monthly magazine Arkansas Life, part of the newspaper's niche publications division, began publication in September 2008. From 2007 to 2015, the newspaper also published the free tabloid Sync Weekly. Beginning in 2020, the ADG ceased weekday publication of the newspaper and moved to an exclusive online version. The only physical newspaper the Democrat-Gazette now publishes is a Sunday edition.

The Daily Record provides daily legal and real estate news each weekday. Healthcare news covered by Healthcare Journal of Little Rock. Entertainment and political coverage is provided weekly in Arkansas Times. Business and economics news is published weekly in Arkansas Business. Entertainment, Political, Business, and Economics news is published Monthly in "Arkansas Talks".

In addition to area newspapers, the Little Rock market is served by a variety of magazines covering diverse interests. The publications are:

 At Home in Arkansas
 AY Magazine
 Inviting Arkansas
 Little Rock Family
 Little Rock Soiree
 RealLIVING

Television
Many television networks have local affiliates in Little Rock, in addition to numerous independent stations. As for cable TV services, Comcast has a monopoly over Little Rock and much of Pulaski County. Some suburbs have the option of having Comcast, Charter or other cable companies.

Television stations in the Little Rock area include:

Infrastructure

Healthcare
Hospitals in Little Rock include:

 Arkansas State Hospital – Psychiatric Division
 Arkansas Children's Hospital
 Arkansas Heart Hospital
 Baptist Health Medical Center
 Central Arkansas Veteran's Health care System (CAVHS)
 Pinnacle Pointe Hospital
 St. Vincent Health System
 UAMS Medical Center

Transportation

List of highways

Two primary Interstate Highways and four auxiliary Interstates serve Little Rock. Interstate 40 (I-40) passes through North Little Rock to the north, and I-30 enters the city from the south, ending at I-40 in the north of the Arkansas River. Shorter routes designed to accommodate the flow of urban traffic across town include I-430, which bypasses the city to the west, I-440, which serves the eastern part of Little Rock including Clinton National Airport, and I-630 which runs east–west through the city, connecting west Little Rock with the central business district. I-530 runs southeast to Pine Bluff as a spur route.
Interstate 57 (I-57) is planned to reach Little Rock.

U.S. Route 70 (US 70 parallels I-40 into North Little Rock before multiplexing with I-30 at the Broadway exit (exit 141B). US 67 and US 167 share the same route from the northeast before splitting. US 67 and US 70 multiplex with I-30 to the southwest. US 167 multiplexes with US 65 and I-530 to the southeast.

Rail

Amtrak serves the city twice daily via the Texas Eagle, with northbound service to Chicago and southbound service to San Antonio, as well as numerous intermediate points. Through service to Los Angeles and intermediate points operates three times a week. The train carries coaches, a sleeping car, a dining car, and a Sightseer Lounge car. Reservations are required.

Class I railroads
BNSF Railway (BNSF)
Union Pacific Railroad (UP)

Aviation

Six airlines serve 16 national/international gateway cities, e.g. Atlanta, Dallas, Chicago, Charlotte, New York City, etc. from Clinton National Airport. In 2006 they carried approximately 2.1 million passengers on approximately 116 daily flights to and from Little Rock.

Bus
Greyhound Lines serves Dallas and Memphis, as well as intermediate points, with numerous connections to other cities and towns. Jefferson Lines serves Fort Smith, Kansas City, and Oklahoma City, as well as intermediate points, with numerous connections to other cities and towns. These carriers operate out of the North Little Rock bus station.

Public transportation

Rock Region Metro, which until 2015 was named the Central Arkansas Transit Authority (CATA), provide public bus service within the city. As of January 2010, CATA operated 23 regular fixed routes, 3 express routes, as well as special events shuttle buses and paratransit service for disabled persons. Of the 23 fixed-route services, 16 offer daily service, 6 offer weekday service with limited service on Saturday, and one route runs exclusively on weekdays. The three express routes run on weekday mornings and afternoons.

Since November 2004, Rock Region Metro's Metro Streetcar system (formerly the River Rail Electric Streetcar) has served downtown Little Rock and North Little Rock. The Streetcar is a -long heritage streetcar system that runs from the North Little Rock City Hall and throughout downtown Little Rock before it crosses over to the William J. Clinton Presidential Library. The streetcar line has fourteen stops and a fleet of five cars with a daily ridership of around 350.

Modal characteristics
According to the 2016 American Community Survey, 82.9 percent of working Little Rock residents commuted by driving alone, 8.9 percent carpooled, 1.1 percent used public transportation, and 1.8 percent walked. About 1.3 percent commuted by all other means of transportation, including taxi, bicycle, and motorcycle. About 4 percent worked out of the home.

In 2015, 8.2 percent of city of Little Rock households were without a car, which increased slightly to 8.9 percent in 2016. The national average was 8.7 percent in 2016. Little Rock averaged 1.58 cars per household in 2016, compared to a national average of 1.8 per household.

Notable people

 Matt Besser (born 1967), improvisational comedian and Upright Citizens Brigade co-founder
 Bobo Brazil (1924–1998), African-American professional wrestler
 Howell Chambers Brown (1880–1954), printmaker
 Minnie A. Buzbee (1880–1955), banker, advertising executive
 Chelsea Clinton (born 1980), daughter of Bill and Hillary Clinton
 Jeremy Davis (born 1985), former bassist of rock band Paramore
 Danielle Evans (born 1985), model, winner of Cycle 6 of "America's Next Top Model"
 John Gould Fletcher (1886–1950), Pulitzer Prize–winning Imagist poet and author
 Carlos Hathcock (1942–1999), Marine sniper
 Will Hastings (born 1996), football player for the New England Patriots
 Amy Lee (born 1981), vocalist and cofounder of rock band Evanescence
 The Little Rock Nine, group of African American students who were initially prevented by the state government from entering a racially segregated school in 1957 (most members were born in Little Rock).
 Douglas MacArthur (1880–1964), U.S. general
 Sanford N. McDonnell (1922–2012), engineer, businessman and philanthropist; former chairman and CEO of McDonnell Douglas
 Darren McFadden (born 1987), football player for the Dallas Cowboys
 Charlotte Moorman (1933–1991), cellist and advocate for avant-garde music
 Ben Piazza (1933–1991), actor
 Bobby Portis (born 1995), NBA player for the Milwaukee Bucks
 Nate Powell (born 1978), graphic novelist and musician.
 Florence Price (1887–1953), classical composer
 Brooks Robinson (born 1937), Hall of Fame third baseman for the Baltimore Orioles
 Leora Bettison Robinson (1840–1914), author, educator
 Pharoah Sanders (born 1940), jazz saxophonist
 Sheryl Underwood (born 1963), Emmy-winning co-host of The Talk, stand-up comedian and actress
 Charlotte Andrews Stephens, the first African American to teach in the city

Sister cities
Little Rock's sister cities are:
 Kaohsiung, Taiwan (1983)
 Hanam, Gyeonggi-do, South Korea (1992)
 Changchun, Jilin, China (1994)
 Newcastle upon Tyne, Tyne and Wear, England,  United Kingdom (1999)
 Caxias do Sul, Rio Grande do Sul,  Brazil (2017)

See also

Arkansas Metropolitan Areas
Baptist Missionary Association of America
Jack Stephens Center
List of capitals in the United States
Little Rock Air Force Base
Lucie's Place
National Register of Historic Places listings in Little Rock, Arkansas

Notes

References

Further reading

The Atlas of Arkansas, Richard M. Smith 1989
Cities in the U.S.; The South, Fourth Edition, Volume 1, Linda Schmittroth, 2001
Greater Little Rock: a contemporary portrait, Letha Mills, 1990
How We Lived: Little Rock as an American City, Frederick Hampton Roy, 1985
Morgan, James. "Little Rock: The 2005 American Heritage Great American Place" American Heritage, October 2005.

Redefining the Color Line: Black Activism in Little Rock, Arkansas, 1940-1970, John A. Kirk, 2002.

External links

 Government
 
 Services at Rock Region METRO
 General information
 
 
 
 Little Rock, Arkansas  at TripSavvy (tripsavvy.com)
 

 
1821 establishments in Arkansas Territory
Arkansas populated places on the Arkansas River
Cities in Arkansas
Cities in Little Rock–North Little Rock–Conway metropolitan area
Cities in Pulaski County, Arkansas
County seats in Arkansas
Planned cities in the United States
Populated places established in 1821
Special economic zones of the United States
Twin cities